Isle-Aubigny is a commune in the Aube department in north-central France.

Population

See also
Communes of the Aube department

References

Communes of Aube
Aube communes articles needing translation from French Wikipedia